The Day is a daily online newspaper for primary and secondary schools in the United Kingdom and internationally which links news stories to national curriculums and encourages pupils to debate and engage with the wider world. 

The Day was founded in 2011 by the British journalist Richard Addis and by 2013 had 670 subscribing schools, reaching 600,000 students.

The Day is published by The Day News & Media. It has no advertisements. The first story was published on 6 January 2011, titled "Terrible floods in Australia bring ruin and snakes."

In 2015, The Day launched its sister publication, The Day Explorer, for primary school students. The first story was published on 13 April, titled “Cornish people declared a national minority”.

The Day offers a free newsletter to parents, called The Day Home. It includes a daily round up of news and current affairs topics to discuss with children.

In July 2020, the website apologised and paid an undisclosed amount to author JK Rowling for an article that implied that she was transphobic and should be boycotted.

Educational usage 
In 2021, The Day became a business signatory on the National Literacy Trust’s Vision for Literacy pledge.

References

External links

The Day on Twitter
The Day on Instagram

British news websites
2011 establishments in the United Kingdom

Publications established in 2011
21st-century British children's literature